Heavyweight is a weight class in combat sports. It may also refer to:

Heavyweight (MMA), mixed martial arts weight class
Heavyweights, 1995 comedy film
"Heavyweight", a 2007 song by Infected Mushroom
"Heavyweight" (song), a 2011 song by Our Lady Peace
Heavyweight, some types of early 20th century North American railway passenger cars, generally having six axles instead of the standard four
Heavyweight (podcast), a podcast produced by Gimlet Media

See also
Weight class, in various sports
World heavyweight championship (disambiguation)